Nelson is a city on the eastern shores of Tasman Bay / Te Tai-o-Aorere. Nelson is the oldest city in the South Island and the second-oldest settled city in New Zealand – it was established in 1841 and became a city by royal charter in 1858.

Nelson City is bordered to the west and south-west by Tasman District Council and to the north-east, east and south-east by Marlborough District Council.

Nelson is well known for its thriving local arts and crafts scene; each year, the city hosts events popular with locals and tourists alike, such as the Nelson Arts Festival. The annual Wearable Art Awards began near Nelson and a local museum, World of WearableArt now showcases winning designs alongside a collection of classic cars.

Sister cities 
Nelson's sister cities are;

  Miyazu, Japan (1976)
  Huangshi, China (1996)
  Yangjiang, China (2014)

Etymology 
Nelson was named in honour of the Admiral Horatio Nelson who defeated both the French and Spanish fleets at the Battle of Trafalgar in 1805. Many roads and public areas around the city are named after people and ships associated with that battle and Trafalgar Street is the main shopping axis of the city. Inhabitants of Nelson are referred to as Nelsonians.

Nelson's Māori name, Whakatū, means 'construct', 'raise', or 'establish'.

In an article to The Colonist newspaper on 16 July 1867, Francis Stevens described Nelson as "The Naples of the Southern Hemisphere". Today, Nelson has the nicknames of "Sunny Nelson" due to its high sunshine hours per year or the "Top of the South" because of its geographic location.

In New Zealand Sign Language, the name is signed by putting the index and middle fingers together which are raised to the nose until the fingertips touch the nose, then move the hand forward so that the fingers point slightly forward away from oneself.

History

Early settlement
Settlement of Nelson began about 700 years ago by Māori. There is evidence the earliest settlements in New Zealand are around the Nelson-Marlborough regions. Some of the earliest recorded iwi in the Nelson district are Ngāti Hāwea, Ngāti Wairangi, Waitaha and Kāti Māmoe. Waitaha people developed the land around the Waimea Gardens, are believed to have been the first people to quarry argillite in around Nelson. They also developed much of the Waimea Gardens complex – more than 400 hectares on the Waimea Plains near Nelson. In the early 1600s, Ngāti Tūmatakōkiri displaced other te Tau Ihu Māori, becoming the dominant tribe in the area until the early 1800s. Raids from northern tribes in the 1820s, led by Te Rauparaha and his Ngāti Toa, soon decimated the local population and quickly displaced them.

Today there are eight mutually recognised tribes of the northernwestern region: Ngāti Kuia, Ngāti Apa ki te Rā Tō, Rangitāne, Ngāti Toarangatira, Ngāti Koata, Ngāti Rārua, Ngāti Tama and Te Atiawa o Te Waka-a-Māui.

New Zealand Company

Planning
The New Zealand Company in London planned the settlement of Nelson. The company earmarked profits to finance the free passage of artisans and labourers, with their families, and for the construction of public works. However, by September 1841 only about one third of the lots had sold. Despite this the colony pushed ahead, and land was surveyed by Frederick Tuckett.

Three ships, the Arrow, Whitby, and Will Watch, sailed from London under the command of Captain Arthur Wakefield. Arriving in New Zealand, they discovered that the new Governor of the colony, William Hobson, would not give them a free hand to secure vast areas of land from the Māori or indeed to decide where to site the colony. However, after some delay, Hobson allowed the Company to investigate the Tasman Bay area at the north end of the South Island. The Company selected the site now occupied by Nelson City because it had the best harbour in the area.

The Company secured land from the Māori, that was not clearly defined, for £800: it included Nelson, Waimea, Motueka, Riwaka and Whakapuaka. This allowed the settlement to begin, but the lack of definition would prove the source of much future conflict. The three colony ships sailed into Nelson Haven during the first week of November 1841. When the four first immigrant ships – Fifeshire,  Mary-Ann, Lord Auckland and Lloyds – arrived three months later, they found the town already laid out with streets, some wooden houses, tents and rough sheds.  Within 18 months the Company had sent out 18 ships with 1052 men, 872 women and 1384 children. However, fewer than ninety of the settlers had the capital to start as landowners.

Cultural and religious immigrants

The early settlement of Nelson province included a proportion of German immigrants, who arrived on the ship Sankt Pauli and formed the nucleus of the villages of Sarau (Upper Moutere) and Neudorf. These were mostly Lutheran Protestants with a small number of Bavarian Catholics.

In 1892 the New Zealand Church Mission Society (NZCMS) was formed in a Nelson church hall.

Problems with land

After a brief initial period of prosperity, the lack of land and of capital caught up with the settlement and it entered a prolonged period of relative depression. The labourers had to accept a cut in their wages. Organised immigration ceased (a state of affairs that continued until the 1850s). By the end of 1843, artisans and labourers began leaving Nelson; by 1846, some 25% of the immigrants had moved away.

The pressure to find more arable land became intense. To the south-east of Nelson lay the wide and fertile plains of the Wairau Valley. The New Zealand Company tried to claim that they had purchased the land. The Māori owners stated adamantly that the Wairau Valley had not formed part of the original land sale and made it clear they would resist any attempts by the settlers to occupy the area. The Nelson settlers led by Arthur Wakefield and Henry Thompson attempted to do just that. This resulted in the Wairau Affray, where 22 settlers and 4 Māori died. The subsequent Government inquiry exonerated the Māori and found that the Nelson settlers had no legitimate claim to any land outside Tasman Bay. Public fears of a Māori attack on Nelson lead to the formation of the Nelson Battalion of Militia in 1845.

City

Nelson township was managed by the Nelson Provincial Council through a Board of Works constituted by the Provincial Government under the Nelson Improvement Act 1856 until 1874. It was proclaimed a Bishop's See and city under letters patent by Queen Victoria on 27 September 1858, the second New Zealand city proclaimed in this manner after Christchurch. Nelson only had some 5,000 residents at this time. Edmund Hobhouse was the first Bishop. The Municipal Corporations Act 1876 stated that Nelson was constituted a city on 30 March 1874.

Coat of arms
Nelson City has a coat of arms, obtained in 1958 from the College of Arms to mark the Centenary of Nelson as a City. The blazon of the arms is:
"Barry wavy Argent and Azure a Cross Flory Sable on a Chief also Azure a Mitre proper And for the Crest on a Wreath of the Colours Issuant from a Mural Crown proper a Lion rampant Gules holding between the fore paws a Sun in splendour or. The supporters on the dexter side a Huia Bird and on the sinister side a Kotuku both proper."

Motto "Palmam qui meruit ferat" (Let him, who has earned it, bear the palm). This motto is the same as that of Lord Nelson.

Nelson Province

From 1853 until 1876, when provincial governments were abolished, Nelson was the capital of Nelson Province. The province itself was much larger than present-day Nelson City and included all of the present-day Buller, Kaikoura, Marlborough, Nelson, and Tasman, as well as the Grey District north of the Grey River and the Hurunui District north of the Hurunui River. The Marlborough Province split from Nelson Province in October 1859.

Nelson provincial anniversary
Nelson Anniversary Day is a public holiday observed in the northern half of the South Island of New Zealand, being the area's provincial anniversary day. It is observed throughout the historic Nelson Province, even though the provinces of New Zealand were abolished in 1876. The modern area of observation includes all of Nelson City and includes all of the present-day Buller, Kaikoura, Marlborough, Tasman districts as well as the Grey District north of the Grey River / Māwheranui and the Hurunui District north of the Hurunui River. The holiday usually falls on the Monday closest to 1 February, the anniversary of the arrival of the first New Zealand Company boat, the Fifeshire on 1 February 1842.

Anniversary celebrations in the early years featured a sailing regatta, horse racing, running races, shooting and ploughing matches. In 1892, the Nelson Jubilee Celebration featured an official week-long programme with church services, sports, concerts, a ball and a grand display of fireworks.

Time gun
In 1858 the Nelson Provincial Council erected a time gun at the spot on Brittania Heights where in 1841, Captain Wakefield erected his flagpole. The gun was fired each Saturday at noon to give the correct time. The gun is now preserved as a historical relic and the Songer Tree marks the site on Signal Hill of the original flagpole.

Geography 
The Nelson-Tasman area comprises two unitary authorities – Nelson City, administered by the Nelson City Council, and Tasman District, administered by the Tasman District Council, based in Richmond  to the southwest. It is between Marlborough, another unitary authority, to the east, and the West Coast Regional Council to the west.

For some while, there has been talk about amalgamating Nelson City and the Tasman District to streamline and render more financially economical the existing co-operation between the two councils, exemplified by the jointly owned Port Nelson and the creation of Nelson Tasman Tourism, a jointly owned tourism promotion organisation.

However, an official poll conducted in April 2012 showed nearly three-quarters of those who voted in Richmond were opposed to the proposal with a narrow majority in favour.

Nelson has beaches and a sheltered harbour. The harbour entrance is protected by a Boulder Bank, a natural,  bank of rocks transported south from Mackay Bluff via longshore drift. The bank creates a perfect natural harbour which enticed the first settlers although the entrance was narrow. The wreck of the Fifeshire on Arrow Rock (now called Fifeshire Rock in memory of this disaster) in 1842 proved the difficulty of the passage. A cut was later made in the bank in 1906 which allowed larger vessels access to the port.

The creation of Rocks Road around the waterfront area after the Tāhunanui slump in 1892 increased the effects of the tide on Nelson city's beach, Tāhunanui, and removed sediment. This meant the popular beach and adjoining car park were being eroded (plus the sand dunes) so a project to replace these sands was put in place and has so far proved a success, with the sand rising a considerable amount and the dunes continuing to grow.

Waterways 
The Nelson territorial authority area is small (just 445 km2) and has four main waterways, the Whangamoa, Wakapuaka, Maitai and Roding Rivers. The Roding River, the southernmost in Nelson, arises in the hills between Mount Meares and Dun Mountain. From there it flows westward before entering the Tasman District where it eventually joins the Waimea River which flows into Waimea Inlet near Rabbit Island. The Maitai River flows westward from the Dun Mountain area into the town centre of Nelson before entering the Nelson Haven then Tasman Bay via 'The Cut'. Major tributaries of the Maitai River are: York and Brook Streams plus Sharland, Packer, Groom, Glen, Neds, Sclanders, Beauchamp and Mill Creeks. The Wakapuaka River, which flows north from the Saddle Hill area to its mouth at Cable Bay in North Nelson, has two main tributaries, the Lud and Teal Rivers. Entering Tasman Bay near Kokorua in the north of Nelson, the Whangamoa River is the longest waterway in Nelson.

Smaller waterways in the south of Nelson include: Saxton Creek, Orchard Stream, Poorman Valley Stream, Arapiki Stream, Jenkins Creek and Maire Stream.

Central city 

The central city of Nelson, also referred to as the central business district (CBD), is bounded by Halifax Street to the north, Rutherford Street to the west, Collingwood Street to the east, and Selwyn Place to the south. Other major streets within the CBD include Trafalgar Street, Bridge Street and Hardy Street.

Suburbs 
Suburbs within Nelson City's territorial area borders are grouped into four city districts:

Nelson North:
 Glenduan
 Wakapuaka
 Todds Valley
 Marybank
 Atawhai
 Dodson Valley
 Brooklands

City Centre:
 Nelson Central
 Port Nelson
 Beachville
 The Wood
 Hanby Park
 Maitai
 Nelson East
 Nelson South
 Toi Toi (Victory Village)
 Bishopdale
 The Brook
 Washington Valley
 Stepneyville
 Britannia Heights

Tāhunanui-Port Hills:
 Tāhunanui
 Enner Glynn
 Moana
 Tasman Heights
 Annesbrook
 Wakatu

Stoke:
 Stoke
 Greenmeadows Park
 Nayland
 Monaco
 Maitlands
 Saxton

The Nelson commuter belt extends to Richmond, Brightwater, Hope, Māpua and Wakefield in the Tasman District.

National parks 
Nelson is surrounded by mountains on three sides with Tasman Bay on the other and the region is the gateway to Abel Tasman National Park, Kahurangi National Park, Lakes Rotoiti and Rotoroa in the Nelson Lakes National Park.

It is a centre for both ecotourism and adventure tourism and has a high reputation among caving enthusiasts due to several prominent cave systems around Takaka Hill and Mounts Owen and Arthur, which hold the largest and deepest explored caverns in the southern hemisphere.

Climate 
Nelson has a temperate oceanic climate (Cfb), with mild winters and warm summers. Nelson has rainfall evenly distributed throughout the year and has fewer frosts due to the highly marine geography of New Zealand. Winter is the stormiest time, when gales and storms are more common. Nelson has one of the sunniest climates of all major New Zealand centres, earning the nickname 'Sunny Nelson' with an annual average total of over 2400 hours of sunshine.

"Centre of New Zealand" monument

Nelson has a monument on Botanical Hill, near the centre of the city. The walk to this is called the "Centre of New Zealand walk". Despite the name, this monument does not mark the actual geographic centre of New Zealand.

Instead, the monument marks the "zero, zero" point to which the first geodetic surveys of New Zealand were referenced. These surveys were started in the 1870s by John Spence Browning, the Chief Surveyor for Nelson. From this 360-degree viewpoint, survey marks in neighbouring regions (including Wellington in the North Island) could be triangulated and the local surveys connected.

Owing to the coarse nature of the underlying data (use of rectangular areas of 7.5 minutes of arc on each side), the centre calculated by Dr Reilly has quite large error margins. Recalculating the result with more modern and accurate data shows the geographic centre of New Zealand is approximately 60 km southwest of Nelson, in the Big Bush Conservation Area north of Saint Arnaud, New Zealand.

Demographics 

Nelson Region had a population of 50,880 at the 2018 New Zealand census, an increase of 4,443 people (9.6%) since the 2013 census, and an increase of 7,992 people (18.6%) since the 2006 census. There were 19,821 households. There were 24,804 males and 26,076 females, giving a sex ratio of 0.95 males per female. The median age was 43.4 years (compared with 37.4 years nationally), with 9,027 people (17.7%) aged under 15 years, 8,469 (16.6%) aged 15 to 29, 23,541 (46.3%) aged 30 to 64, and 9,843 (19.3%) aged 65 or older.

Ethnicities were 86.7% European/Pākehā, 10.7% Māori, 2.3% Pacific peoples, 7.1% Asian, and 2.3% other ethnicities. People may identify with more than one ethnicity.

The percentage of people born overseas was 23.6, compared with 27.1% nationally.

Although some people objected to giving their religion, 56.2% had no religion, 31.8% were Christian, 0.9% were Hindu, 0.2% were Muslim, 1.2% were Buddhist and 2.6% had other religions.

Of those at least 15 years old, 9,150 (21.9%) people had a bachelor or higher degree, and 7,674 (18.3%) people had no formal qualifications. The median income was $29,600, compared with $31,800 nationally. 5,634 people (13.5%) earned over $70,000 compared to 17.2% nationally. The employment status of those at least 15 was that 19,311 (46.1%) people were employed full-time, 7,119 (17.0%) were part-time, and 1,278 (3.1%) were unemployed.

Economy 
The Nelson economy (and that of the neighbouring Tasman District) is based on the 'big five' industries; seafood, horticulture, forestry, farming and tourism. Port Nelson is the biggest fishing port in Australasia. There are also a range of growth industries, including art and craft, aviation, engineering technology, and information technology. The region is sixth in terms of GDP growth in the 2007–10 period.

The combined sub-national GDP of Nelson and Tasman District was estimated at $3.4 billion in 2010, 1.8% of New Zealand's national GDP.

Nelson is home to various business agencies that serve the city and its surrounds, including Nelson Tasman Tourism (NTT), which aims to promote the region and help advertisers reach visitors from New Zealand and overseas, and the Nelson Regional Economic Development Agency (EDA), which works to "coordinate, promote, facilitate, investigate, develop, implement, support and fund initiatives relating to economic development [and] employment growth ... within the Nelson region ..."

Below is a list of some of the region's largest companies and employers:
 Regional airline Air Nelson has its headquarters and maintenance base at Nelson Airport.
 Helicopters (NZ) has its headquarters and maintenance base at Nelson Airport.
 Japanese automobile manufacturer Honda has its New Zealand distribution centre in the Whakatu Industrial Estate in Stoke.
 Beverage company McCashins has a microbrewery in Stoke
 Sea Dragon Marine Oils has a fish oil refinery in Annesbrook.
 The Cawthron Institute has a research facility in The Wood.
 Food manufacturer, the Talley's Group has processing facilities at Port Nelson.
 The New Zealand King Salmon Company processes Chinook salmon at its factory in Annesbrook.
 Pic's Peanut Butter is made in its Stoke, New Zealand factory.

In 2013, Nelson Mayor Aldo Miccio worked on a proposal that would see Australian call centres for companies such as Gen-i and Xero relocated to Nelson. The plan was in response to Australian companies moving call and contact centres out of Asia because their Australian customers preferred English-speaking centres. If the plan was successful, Mr Miccio expected 100 to 300 jobs paying NZ$50,000-plus in the first year to be created in Nelson.

Government

Local 

As a unitary authority, the Nelson City Council has the combined responsibilities and functions of both a territorial (local) and regional council. This is different from most other local authorities in New Zealand. More often a regional council is a separate organisation with several territorial authorities (city or district councils) within its borders. Other unitary authorities are the Auckland Council, Gisborne District Council, Marlborough District Council, Tasman District Council and the Chatham Islands Council.

The Nelson City Council currently holds its elections under the First Past the Post electoral system once every three years, with the most recent election held on 12 October 2019. Electors vote by indicating their choice for Mayor by placing a tick beside one of the names and the person who receives the most votes becomes Mayor. Councillors are elected the same way but voters could cast multiple votes, with the 12 candidates who each receive the most votes becoming Councillors. Voters in this system may vote for no more than 12 candidates. The elections are conducted by post over a three-week period to make it as convenient as possible for people to vote.

The other option permitted under the Local Electoral Act 2001, but not currently used in Nelson, is the Single Transferable Vote system. Multiple-member districts are used. Electors vote by ranking candidates in order of preference by placing a number beside candidates' names. The elector can mark a preference for one or up to the total number of candidates on the paper. The number of votes required for a candidate to be elected, the quota, depends on the number of positions to be filled and the number of valid votes. (Election of mayor may be held using the Instant-runoff vote method.)

Under the Local Electoral Act 2002, the Nelson City Council can resolve to change the electoral system to be used for the next two elections, and it must review this decision every six years. A referendum was held in 2003 to decide which electoral system would be used for the 2004 and 2007 Nelson City Council elections. The outcome was that the First Past the Post system was retained. The 2008 review retains that system for the 2010 and 2013 elections.

On 12 October 2013, Rachel Reese was elected as Nelson's first woman mayor after receiving 1,500 votes more than incumbent mayor Aldo Miccio.

As of 13 October 2022, the current council members for the 2022 to 2025 term are:-

National 
Nelson is covered by one general electorate: Nelson and one Maori electorate: Te Tai Tonga.

As of the 2020 general election, Nelson is held by Rachel Boyack of the Labour Party. The Maori electorate Te Tai Tonga, which covers the entire South Island and part of Wellington in the North Island, is currently held by Labour and represented by Rino Tirikatene.

Culture and the arts 

As the major regional centre, the city offers many lodgings, restaurants, and unique speciality shopping such as at the Jens Hansen Goldsmiths where "The One Ring" in The Lord of the Rings film trilogy was designed.
 Nelson has a vibrant local music and arts scene and is known nationwide for its culturally idiosyncratic craftsmen. These include potters, glass blowers (such as Flamedaisy Glass Design and Höglund Art Glass Studio & Gallery), and dozens of wood carvers using native New Zealand southern beech and exotic macrocarpa.
 Nelson is a popular visitor destination and year-round attracts both New Zealanders and international tourists.
 The Nelson Saturday Market is a popular weekly market where one can buy direct from local artists.
 The Theatre Royal was restored in 2010 and is the oldest wooden functioning theatre in the Southern Hemisphere (built 1878)
 Art organisations include the Suter Art Gallery and Nelson Arts Festival.
 The Victory Village community received the 2010 New Zealander of the Year award for Community of the Year.

The first rugby union match in New Zealand took place at the Botanic Reserve in Nelson on 14 May 1870, between the Nelson Suburbs FC and Nelson College, and an informative commemorative plaque was renovated at the western edge of the grassed area by Nelson City Council in 2006.

Marae

Whakatū Marae, in the suburb of Atawhai, is the marae (meeting ground) of Ngāti Kuia, Ngāti Kōata, Ngāti Rārua, Ngāti Tama ki Te Tau Ihu, Ngāti Toa Rangatira and Te Atiawa o Te Waka-a-Māui. It includes the Kākāti wharenui (meeting house).

In October 2020, the Government committed $240,739 from the Provincial Growth Fund to restore the marae, creating an estimated 9 jobs.

Events and festivals
Several major events take place:
 Nelson Jazz & Blues Festival – January
 Nelson Kite Festival – January
 Nelson Yacht Regatta – January
 Adam Chamber Music Festival – biennial – January / February
 Evolve Festival – February
 Marchfest – March
 Taste Nelson festival – March
 Winter Music Festival – July
 Nelson Arts Festival – October

Architecture

Unlike many towns and cities in New Zealand, Nelson has retained many Victorian buildings in its historic centre and the South Street area has been designated as having heritage value.

Surviving historic buildings

 Nelson Cathedral
 Amber House
 Broadgreen House
 Cabragh House
 Chez Eelco
 Fairfield House
 Founders Park Windmill
 Isel House
 Melrose House
 Nelson Central School Renwick House
 Theatre Royal
 Victorian Rose Pub
 Redwood College (Founders Park)
 Nelson Centre of Musical Arts (formerly Nelson School of Music) Est. 1894

Museums
The Nelson region houses several museums.
 The Founders Heritage Park houses a number of groups with historical themes, including transport.
 The Nelson Provincial Museum houses a collection of locally significant artefacts.
 The World of WearableArt houses a collection of collectable cars and a collections of works from the Wearable Art Awards.

Parks and zoo

Nelson has a large number and variety of public parks and reserves maintained at public expense by Nelson City Council. Major reserves include Grampians Reserve, close to the suburb of Braemar, and the botanical Reserve in the east of Nelson, close to The Wood.

Natureland Zoological Park is a small zoological facility close to Tāhunanui Beach. The facility is popular with children, where they can closely approach wallabies, monkeys, meerkats, llamas and alpacas, Kune Kune pigs, otters, and peacocks. There are also turtles, tropical fish and a walk through aviary. Although the zoo nearly closed in 2008, the Orana Wildlife Trust took over its running instead. It looked like a bright future ahead for Natureland and its staff but since the repeated earthquakes in Christchurch in 2011 and the damage to Orana Park, Orana Wildlife Trust are uncertain of the future of Natureland.
Orana Wildlife trust have since pulled out of Natureland, which is now run independently.

Sport

Major sports teams

Major venues

Infrastructure and services

Healthcare 
The main hospital in Nelson is the Nelson Hospital. It is the seat of the Nelson Marlborough District Health Board.

The Manuka Street Hospital is a private institution.

Law enforcement 
The Nelson Central Police Station, located in St John Street, is the headquarters for the Tasman Police District. The Tasman Police District has the lowest crime rate within New Zealand.

Gangs
Several gangs have established themselves in Nelson. They include the now disbanded Lost Breed and the Red Devils a support club for the Hells Angels. The Rebels Motorcycle Club also have a presence in the wider Nelson-Tasman area.

Electricity 
The Nelson City Municipal Electricity Department (MED) established the city's public electricity supply in 1923, with electricity generated by a coal-fired power station at Wakefield Quay. The city was connected to the newly-commissioned Cobb hydroelectric power station in 1944 and to the rest of the South Island grid in 1958. The grid connection saw the Wakefield Quay power station was relegated to standby duty before being decommissioned in 1964.

Today, Nelson Electricity operates the local distribution network in the former MED area, which covers the CBD and inner suburbs, while Network Tasman operates the local distribution network in the outer suburbs (including Stoke, Tāhunanui and Atawhai) and rural areas.

Transport

Air transport
Nelson Airport is located southwest of the city, at Annesbrook. The airport operates a single terminal and 1,347-metre (4,420 ft) runway, and in 2018 was the fifth-busiest airport in New Zealand by passenger numbers. There are more than a million  passenger movements using the airport terminal annually and the airport averages 90 aircraft movements every day, with a plane taking off or landing every 4.5 minutes during scheduled hours.

It is primarily used for domestic flights, with regular flights to and from Auckland, Christchurch, Hamilton, Kapiti Coast, Palmerston North and Wellington. Nelson Airport is home to Air Nelson, which operates and maintains New Zealand's largest domestic airline fleet and was also the headquarters of Origin Pacific Airways until their collapse in 2006. Sounds Air offers flights from Nelson to Wellington.

In 2006, the airport received restricted international airport status to facilitate small private jets.

In February 2018, the approach road to the airport was flooded when the adjoining Jenkins Creek burst its banks during a storm that brought king tides and strong winds. The airport was closed for about one hour. The airport's Chief Executive said that the proposed runway extension would be planned around the latest sea level rise forecast, and that the airport was "here to stay", despite the concerns over the threats posed by sea level rise.

Maritime transport
Port Nelson is the maritime gateway for the Nelson, Tasman and Marlborough regions and a vital hub for economic activity. The following shipping companies call at Port Nelson:
 Australian National Line / CMA CGM
 Maersk Line
 Mediterranean Shipping Company
 Pacifica Shipping
 Toyofuji Shipping
 Swire Shipping

In the mid-1994, a group of local businessmen, fronted by local politician Owen Jennings proposed building a deep-water port featuring a one-kilometre-long wharf extending from the Boulder Bank into Tasman Bay, where giant ships could berth and manoeuvre with ease. Known as Port Kakariki, the $97 million project was to become the hub to ship West Coast coal to Asia, as well as handling logs, which would be barged across Tasman Bay from Mapua.

In January 2010 the Western Blue Highway, a Nelson to New Plymouth ferry service, was proposed by Port Taranaki. However, to date neither the Interislander nor Bluebridge have shown any interest in the route.

Anchor Shipping and Foundry Company 

The 'Anchor Shipping and Foundry Company' was formed 31 March 1901 from the earlier companies of Nathaniel Edwards & Co (1857–1880) and the Anchor Steam Shipping Company (1880–1901). The Anchor Company never departed from its original aim of providing services to the people of Nelson and the West Coast of the South Island and was never a large company; it only owned 37 ships during its history. At its peak around 1930 there were 16 vessels in the fleet. The company operated three nightly return trips per week ferry service between Nelson and Wellington and a daily freight service was maintained between the two ports in conjunction with the Pearl Kasper Shipping Company while another service carried general cargo on a Nelson-Onehunga route. In 1974, the Anchor Company was sold and merged into the Union Company.

Public transport 
Nelson Motor Service Company ran the first motor bus in Nelson in 1906 and took over the Palace horse buses in 1907.

NBUS 
NBus provides public transport services between Nelson and Richmond, as well as on four local routes around Nelson city.

The Late Late Bus is a weekend night transport service between Nelson and Richmond. NBus Cards were replaced by Bee cards on 3 August 2020.

InterCity provides daily bus services connecting Nelson with towns and cities around the South Island.

Taxis and shuttle vans 
Taxi companies in Nelson include the following:
 Nelson Bays Cabs
 Nelson City Taxis

There are no conventional bus services to Nelson Airport: the airport is served by a fleet of shuttle vans provided by several operators including Nelson Bays Shuttles & Coaches and Super Shuttles. Airport shuttle vans typically travel non-stop to or from the airport and about the city and suburbs picking up or dropping passengers at each address.

Rail transport 
Nelson is one of only three major urban areas in New Zealand without a rail connection – the others being Taupo and Queenstown. The Nelson Section was an isolated,  gauge, government-owned railway line between Nelson and Glenhope. It operated for  years between 1876 and 1955.

In 1886, a route was proposed from Nelson to the junction of the Midland Railway Company at Buller via Richmond, Waimea West, Upper Moutere, Motueka, the Motueka Valley, Tadmor and Glenhope.

The only sign of rail activity in Nelson today is a short heritage operation run by the Nelson Railway Society from Founders Heritage Park using their own line between Wakefield Grove and Grove. The society has proposed future extensions of their line, possibly into or near the city centre. There have been several proposals to connect Nelson to the South Island rail network, but none have come to fruition.

Horse tramway 

The Dun Mountain Railway was a horse drawn tramway serving a mine.

Road transport 
The highway travels through the city and nearby town of Richmond, continuing southwest across the plains of the Wairoa and Motueka Rivers. Plans to construct a motorway linking North Nelson to Brightwater in the south have so far been successful. A number of studies have been undertaken since 2007 including the 2007 North Nelson to Brightwater Study, the Southern Link Road Project and the Arterial Traffic Study. On 28 June 2013, the Nelson Mayor Aldo Miccio and Nelson MP Nick Smith jointly wrote to Transport Minister Gerry Brownlee seeking for the Southern Link to be given Road of National Significance (RoNS) status.

Other significant road projects proposed over the years include a cross-city tunnel from Tāhunanui Drive to Haven Road; or from Annesbrook (or Tāhunanui) to Emano Street in Victory Square; or from Tāhunanui to Washington Valley.

The passenger and freight company Newmans Coach Lines was formed in Nelson in 1879, and merged with Transport Nelson in 1972.

Education

Secondary schools 
 Garin College
 Nayland College
 Nelson College
 Nelson College for Girls

Tertiary institutions 
Nelson hosts two tertiary education institutions, the main one being Nelson Marlborough Institute of Technology. The institute has two main campuses, one in Nelson and the other in Blenheim, in the neighbouring Marlborough region. The Institute has been providing tertiary education in the Nelson-Marlborough region for the last 100 years.

Nelson also has a University of Canterbury College of Education campus which currently has an intake two out of every three years for the primary sector

Media

Broadcasting 
The city is served by all major national radio and television stations, with terrestrial television (Freeview) and FM radio. Local radio stations include The Hits (formerly Radio Nelson), More FM (formerly Fifeshire FM), The Breeze, ZM (formerly The Planet 97FM) and community station Fresh FM. The city has one local television station, Mainland Television.

Print 
The Nelson Examiner was the first newspaper published in the South Island. It was established by Charles Elliott (1811–1876) in 1842, within a few weeks of New Zealand Company settlers arriving in Nelson. Other early newspapers were The Colonist and the Nelson Evening Mail. Today the Nelson Mail publishes four days a week and is part of the Fairfax Group. The Nelson Mail also publishes the weekly community papers The Nelson Leader and The Tasman Leader. The city's largest circulating newspaper is the locally owned Nelson Weekly, which is published every Wednesday.

WildTomato is a glossy monthly lifestyle magazine, focused on the Nelson and Marlborough regions – the Top of the South Island of New Zealand. The regional magazine was launched by Murray Farquhar as a 16-page local magazine in Nelson in July 2006.

Notable people 

 Sophia Anstice – seamstress and businesswoman
 Harry Atmore – politician
 Francis Bell – politician
 George Bennett – cyclist
 Chester Borrows – politician
 Mark Bright – rugby union player
 Jeremy Brockie – footballer
 Cory Brown – footballer
 Paul Brydon – footballer
 Mel Courtney – politician
 Ryan Crotty – rugby union player
 Rod Dixon – athlete
 Frederick Richard Edmund Emmett – music dealer and colour therapist
 Dame Sister Pauline Engel – nun and educator
 Rose Frank – photographer
 John Guy – cricket player
 Isaac Mason Hill – social reformer, servant, storekeeper and ironmonger
 Frederick Nelson Jones – inventor
 Nina Jones – painter
 Charles Littlejohn – rower
 Liam Malone – athlete
 Simon Mannering – rugby league player
 Aldo Miccio – politician
 Edgar Neale – politician
 Geoffrey Palmer – politician and former Prime Minister
 Nick Smith – politician
 Frank Howard Nelson Stapp – concert impresario
 Rhian Sheehan – composer and musician
 Riki van Steeden – footballer
 Mike Ward – politician
 George William Wallace Webber – postmaster, boarding-house keeper and farmer
 Guy Williams – comedian

Panoramas

See also
 List of twin towns and sister cities in New Zealand

References 

Bibliography
 A Complete Guide To Heraldry by A.C. Fox-Davies, 1909.

External links 

 
 Historic images of Nelson from the collection of the Museum of New Zealand Te Papa Tongarewa
 Nelson City Council
 Nelson Tasman Tourism

 
1858 establishments in New Zealand
Former provincial capitals of New Zealand
German-New Zealand culture
Marinas in New Zealand
Populated places established in 1858
Port cities in New Zealand
South Island
Wine regions of New Zealand

 
Geographical centres